Sophia Schneider (born 12 September 1997) is a German biathlete. She won silver medal at Biathlon World Championships 2023 with Germany women's relay team.

Biathlon results
All results are sourced from the International Biathlon Union.

World Championships
1 medals (1 silver)

World Cup

Relay podiums

References

External links

1997 births
Living people
German female biathletes
Biathlon World Championships medalists
21st-century German women